Coundon Grange is a village in County Durham, England.
 It is situated to the east of Bishop Auckland.
In the 2001 census Coundon Grange had a population of 235.

References

External links

Villages in County Durham